Patricia O. Daley is a Jamaican-born British human geographer and academic, specialising in forced migration, political ecology, and Africa. She is Professor of Human Geography of Africa at the University of Oxford and a Fellow of Jesus College, Oxford.

Early life and education
Daley was born and brought up in rural Jamaica. At the age of 12, she emigrated to England. She attended school in Hackney, London, and as a teenager lived in the Pembury Estate.

Daley was the first of her family to attend university, and studied at Middlesex Polytechnic, graduating with a Bachelor of Science (BSc) degree. She then undertook postgraduate studies at Goldsmiths College and the School of Oriental and African Studies, both part of the University of London, graduating with a Master of Arts degree and a Postgraduate Certificate in Education (PGCE). She then moved to the University of Oxford to study for a Doctor of Philosophy (DPhil) degree. She completed her doctorate in 1989 with a thesis titled "Refugees and underdevelopment in Africa: the case of Barundi refugees in Tanzania".

Academic career
Daley previously taught at Dartmouth College, and Loughborough University. In 1996, she moved to the University of Oxford, where she was appointed University Lecturer in Human Geography and joined Pembroke College, Oxford. She is the first black woman to be appointed a lecturer at Oxford. She is now a Fellow of Jesus College, Oxford. She served Jesus College as Tutor for Women from 1998 to 2004, and as Tutor for Admissions from 1999 to 2002. She was the University Assessor for the 2015/2016 academic year. She was awarded a Title of Distinction as Professor of the Human Geography of Africa in September 2016.

In 2017, Daley was one 24 notable individuals chosen by the University of Oxford to have their portrait painted. Daley's portrait was painted by Binny Matthews.  It was first exhibited at a temporary exhibition and then permanently at the Exam Schools of Oxford University.  The portrait commission was part of a project to augment the existing portraiture at Oxford with a greater, "diversity of background, gender and accomplishments of scholars, staff and alumni."

In 2020, Daley was announced as one of the United Kingdom's 100 most influential people of African or African Caribbean heritage, in recognition of her contribution to education by being included in the 2021 edition of the annual Powerlist.

Selected works

 
 R Elena Fiddian-Qasmiyeh, R . E. and  P. O. Daley (Eds.). (2018). Routledge Handbook of South-South Relations. Routledge. ISBN 1138652008.

References

Living people
Human geographers
Jamaican geographers
Fellows of Jesus College, Oxford
Alumni of Middlesex University
Alumni of Goldsmiths, University of London
Alumni of SOAS University of London
Alumni of the University of Oxford
Dartmouth College faculty
Academics of Loughborough University
Women geographers
Year of birth missing (living people)